The 11th parallel south is a circle of latitude that is 11 degrees south of the Earth's equatorial plane. It crosses the Atlantic Ocean, Africa, the Indian Ocean, Australasia, the Pacific Ocean and South America.

Around the world
Starting at the Prime Meridian and heading eastwards, the parallel 11° south passes through:

{| class="wikitable plainrowheaders"
! scope="col" width="125" | Co-ordinates
! scope="col" | Country, territory or sea
! scope="col" | Notes
|-
| style="background:#b0e0e6;" | 
! scope="row" style="background:#b0e0e6;" | Atlantic Ocean
| style="background:#b0e0e6;" |
|-
| 
! scope="row" | 
|
|-valign="top"
| 
! scope="row" | 
|
|-
| 
! scope="row" | 
|
|-valign="top"
| 
! scope="row" | 
| For about 
|-
| 
! scope="row" | 
| For about 
|-valign="top"
| 
! scope="row" | 
| For about 
|-
| 
! scope="row" | 
| For about 
|-
| 
! scope="row" | 
| For about 
|-valign="top"
| 
! scope="row" | 
|
|-
| 
! scope="row" | 
|
|-
| 
! scope="row" | 
|
|-
| style="background:#b0e0e6;" | 
! scope="row" style="background:#b0e0e6;" | Lake Malawi
| style="background:#b0e0e6;" |
|-
| 
! scope="row" | 
|
|-
| 
! scope="row" | 
|
|-
| style="background:#b0e0e6;" | 
! scope="row" style="background:#b0e0e6;" | Indian Ocean
| style="background:#b0e0e6;" |
|-
| 
! scope="row" | 
| Passing through the island of Dana just south of Rote Island, 
|-valign="top"
| style="background:#b0e0e6;" | 
! scope="row" style="background:#b0e0e6;" | Timor Sea
| style="background:#b0e0e6;" | Passing just north of Melville Island and the Cobourg Peninsula, 
|-
| 
! scope="row" | 
| Croker Island, Northern Territory
|-
| style="background:#b0e0e6;" | 
! scope="row" style="background:#b0e0e6;" | Arafura Sea
| style="background:#b0e0e6;" | Passing just north of the Wessel Islands, 
|-
| 
! scope="row" | 
| Cape York Peninsula, Queensland
|-valign="top"
| style="background:#b0e0e6;" | 
! scope="row" style="background:#b0e0e6;" | Coral Sea
| style="background:#b0e0e6;" | Passing between islands of the Louisiade Archipelago, 
|-
| style="background:#b0e0e6;" | 
! scope="row" style="background:#b0e0e6;" | Solomon Sea
| style="background:#b0e0e6;" | Passing just north of Rennell Island, 
|-valign="top"
| style="background:#b0e0e6;" | 
! scope="row" style="background:#b0e0e6;" | Coral Sea
| style="background:#b0e0e6;" | Passing just south of Makira island,  Passing just south of Nendo Island,  Passing just north of Utupua Island, 
|-valign="top"
| style="background:#b0e0e6;" | 
! scope="row" style="background:#b0e0e6;" | Pacific Ocean
| style="background:#b0e0e6;" | Passing just north of Swains Island,  (claimed by ) Passing just south of Pukapuka atoll, 
|-
| 
! scope="row" | 
|
|-
| 
! scope="row" | 
| Acre
|-
| 
! scope="row" | 
|
|-
| 
! scope="row" | 
|
|-
| 
! scope="row" | 
| Acre
|-
| 
! scope="row" | 
|
|-
| 
! scope="row" | 
| Acre - for about 
|-
| 
! scope="row" | 
|
|-valign="top"
| 
! scope="row" | 
| Rondônia Mato Grosso Tocantins Bahia Sergipe
|-
| style="background:#b0e0e6;" | 
! scope="row" style="background:#b0e0e6;" | Atlantic Ocean
| style="background:#b0e0e6;" |
|}

See also
10th parallel south
12th parallel south

s11